Jovette Rivera (born November 26, 1982) is an American multi-platinum selling music producer and composer, and co-founder of Royal Kingdom Music. Working with top major artists in Asia since 2007, he has had numerous number-ones on the music charts in Japan.

Jovette writes music primarily for singers, television, video games, and commercials.He wrote and produced the 2018 theme song for the INAC Kobe Soccer League "We Are" performed by H5, and the 2008 theme song for the Niigata "Albirex", another national Japanese soccer team.

Original songs (released)

Select discography (CDs, DVDs, performances and television shows)

Television, game and commercial songs (released)

Acting / voice acting

Video game remixes (released)

References

External links 
Official Royal Kingdom Music Website
Official Page for Jovette Rivera
Jovette Rivera's OverClocked ReMix

1982 births
Living people
American voice actors
American male pop singers
American television actors
American music arrangers
American record producers
American male songwriters
American television composers
American film score composers
American musical theatre composers